Jílové u Prahy is a town in Prague-West District in the Central Bohemian Region of the Czech Republic. It has about 4,900 inhabitants. The historic town centre is well preserved and is protected by law as an urban monument zone.

Administrative parts
Villages of Borek, Kabáty, Luka pod Medníkem, Radlík, Studené and Žampach are administrative parts of Jílové u Prahy.

Geography
It lies in the Benešov Uplands. The Sázava River forms the southern municipal border.

History
The first written mention of Jílové is from 1310. It is proved its existence in the 13th century, when it was founded by merger of gold mining settlements. In 1350, Jílové was raised to a royal town by King Charles IV. The gold mining ended in the 15th century during the Hussite Wars and some mines were flooded. The mining and importance of Jílové was partly revived by King Vladislaus II, but another decline of the town came with the Thirty Years' War.

Although it was an unfavorable time for gold mining, the town began to prosper again in the 19th century. In 1897, the railroad was built, and in 1900 the railway connection with Prague was finished.

Demographics

Sights

The town hall is main landmark of the historical centre. It is a former fortress with a tower from the 14th century. It was donated to Jílové as a ruin and after it was reconstructed, the town hall was moved to the building in 1708. In 1724 the upper floor was built. In 1854 the municipality have added a side building to the tower, and in 1855 a prison.

The Church of Saint Adalbert is the oldest building in the town. It was built on the site of a wooden church in the first half of the 13th century and originally dedicated to St. Nicholas. In 1567, it was damaged by a fire, and during the 17th and 18th centuries, the church was repaired and baroqued several times.

Žampach viaduct is a railway arch bridge, the highest stone bridge in the country.

In popular culture
Several shots of the 1984 Oscars-awarded film Amadeus were shot in the church.

Notable people
Edward Kelley (1555–1597), English alchemist and occultist; lived here
František Chvalkovský (1885–1945), politician, diplomat, minister of foreign affairs of Czechoslovakia

Twin towns – sister cities

Jílové u Prahy is twinned with:
 Holzgerlingen, Germany
 Nováky, Slovakia
 Peschici, Italy

References

External links

Cities and towns in the Czech Republic
Populated places in Prague-West District